Over the subsequent course of Chinese history, Hangzhou changed hands many times, and every ruler and every dynasty had its own contributions and modifications to the Hangzhou City Walls. While little remains of them today, the fact that Hangzhou was once a walled city is still evidenced by certain place names around town, especially the names of its ten gatehouses.

Sui Period
Hanghzou's first city walls were built during the Sui Period in the 11th year of Sui Kaihuang, corresponding to 591 AD. Its perimeter is recorded as being 36 li and 90 paces long. Its eastern boundary would have been about where Zhonghe Road (中河路) is today. The western wall ran along the eastern bank of Xihu, the West Lake. To the south the wall pressed up against Fenghuang Mountain (凤凰山) and its northern limit was the Qiantang Gate (钱塘门), roughly where today's No. 6 Park (六公园) is. Certain parts of modern-day Hangzhou's downtown area would not have been included inside the Sui city walls, such as Mt. Wu (吴山) being excluded by an indent in the wall and Wulin Road (武林路) being too far north.

References 

Museums in Hangzhou
City walls in China
History museums in China